Foreign relations have reportedly always been strong between Armenia and Cyprus. Cyprus has been a supporter of Armenia in its struggle for the recognition of the Armenian genocide, economic stability and the resolution to the Nagorno-Karabakh conflict. In return Armenia has been advocating a stable Cyprus after the Turkish invasion in 1974 and supporting a lasting solution to the Cyprus dispute.

Today relations between Armenia and Cyprus include cooperation in the areas of trade, military, intelligence services, foreign policy and arts.

Modern relations

Post Armenian independence

Nagorno-Karabakh conflict

Inter ethnic fighting between Armenia and neighbouring Azerbaijan broke out shortly after the parliament of Nagorno-Karabakh, an autonomous oblast in Azerbaijan, voted to unify the region with Armenia on February 20, 1988. The Armenian demand to unify Karabakh with Armenia, which proliferated in the late 1980s, began in a relatively peaceful manner; however, as the Soviet Union's disintegration neared, the dispute gradually grew into a violent conflict between the ethnic groups in Nagorno-Karabakh, resulting in ethnic cleansing by all sides.
The joint declaration between Cyprus and Armenia in January 2011 mentions that the Republic of Cyprus expresses its support to the constructive efforts of Armenia to resolve Nagorno-Karabakh conflict within the OSCE Minsk Group process through negotiations based on the principles of the United Nations Charter and the Helsinki Final act and the elements proposed by the Presidents of the OSCE Minsk Group Co-Chair countries, which include, inter alia, the determination of the final status of Nagorno-Karabakh through legally binding expression of will. In return Armenian President welcomed Cyprus position as a member of EU for its balanced stance on the Karabakh issue, drawing attention to determination of Nagorno-Karabakh's final status in terms of legally binding free expression of will. .

Armenian genocide recognition

Cyprus has been one of the pioneering countries in recognising the Armenian genocide, when on 25 January 1965 Foreign Minister Spyros Kyprianou first raised the issue to the General Assembly of the United Nations. Prior to his powerful speech, a delegation comprising ARF Dashnaktsoutiun Bureau members Dr. Papken Papazian and Berj Missirlia, as well as Armenian National Committee of Cyprus members Anania Mahdessian and Vartkes Sinanian, handed him a memorandum urging Cyprus' support in raising the issue at the United Nations.

Cyprus was also the first European country (and the second world-wide, after Uruguay) to officially recognise the Armenian genocide. On 24 April 1975, after the determined efforts and the submission by Representative Dr. Antranik L. Ashdjian, Resolution 36 was voted unanimously by the House of Representatives. Representative Aram Kalaydjian was instrumental in passing unanimously through the House of Representatives two more resolutions regarding the Armenian genocide: Resolution 74/29–04–1982, submitted by the Foreign Relations' Parliamentary Committee, and Resolution 103/19–04–1990, submitted by all parliamentary parties. Resolution 103 declared 24 April as a National Remembrance Day of the Armenian Genocide in Cyprus.

Since 1965, when Cypriot government officials started participating in the annual Armenian genocide functions, Cyprus' political leaders are often keynote speakers in those functions organised to commemorate the Armenian genocide. During the last years, there is usually a march starting from the centre of Nicosia and ending at the Sourp Asdvadzadzin church in Strovolos, where a commemorative event takes place in front of the Armenian Genocide Monument; other events may also take place, such as blood donations.

Armenian genocide memorials

As the second country in the world to recognize the Armenian genocide, Cyprus has built three genocide memorials in respect to the victims. One of the memorials is located in Nicosia, and the others are located in Larnaca and Paphos.

Cypriot response to the release of Ramil Safarov

Cyprus Minister of Foreign Affairs  Erato Kozakou-Marcoullis's statement said "we deeply regret and deplore this Presidential pardon and the damage inflicted by the actions that followed the release, aimed at glorifying this hideous crime, to the reconciliation efforts with Azerbaijan and we are also very concerned of its effects on regional stability." Following the release of Ramil Safarov immediate protests broke out in all cities of Cyprus with the biggest being in Nicosia taking place outside the Hungarian Embassy. Cypriot press expressed negatively on the role of the Hungarian government for the release of Ramil Safarov.

Areas of Cooperation

Educational cooperation

There are Armenian Elementary Schools in Cyprus in the cities of Larnaca, Limassol and Nicosia and a Gymnasium in Nicosia. The Melkonian Educational Institute was the most renowned co-educational institution of Armenian-Cypriots. Founded in 1926, the Melkonian Institute was open to Armenian students from all over the world and offered a comprehensive secondary school curriculum. All subjects, except for the Armenian language, were taught in English and foreign languages offered included Greek, French, Arabic, Persian, Russian and Bulgarian. A daily hourly radio programme by the Cyprus Broadcasting Corporation in Armenian includes extensive interviews, news coverage, cultural reports and music. Two Armenian monthly newspapers have been founded on the island, Artsankank (1995) and Azad Tsayn (founded 2003), which provide national and international news, primarily in Armenian and with certain columns printed in Greek and in English.

Economic cooperation

Every year, Cyprus-Armenian Business Forums are held either in Nicosia or in Yerevan, with an aim to further boost trade and investment between the two countries. Armenian companies will be able to expand more effectively into the European Union and Middle East markets in co-operation with Cypriot companies. This co-operation can and should be reciprocal, with Armenia serving as an access route to the Caucasian countries for the business world of Cyprus.

Cultural cooperation

The Armenian community of Cyprus receives a generous funding from the Cypriot government, which enables the organisation of concerts, dance performances, art and photographic exhibitions, as well as literary events. The Armenian Prelature of Cyprus has allocated space within its premises (Utidjian Hall) to encourage cultural events, such as the annual Autumn Book Exhibition. The Middle/Near East Armenian Research Centre (established in 1996 by Vartan Malian) houses a reference library and archival material in its Nicosia premises.

Humanitarian aid
Following the December 1988 earthquake in Armenia, the Republic of Cyprus was one of the first countries to send relief in the form of medicine, doctors and financial aid.

Military cooperation
On August 31, 2021 Armenia, Greece, and Cyprus signed the Tripartite Defence Cooperation Program. The Program sees all three militaries conduct joint training exercises, sharing of expertise and promoting military cooperation between the three countries.

Accession of Armenia in the European Union
Cyprus is openly advocating the accession of Armenia in the European Union in the shortest period of time. Referring to the EU Armenia relations, President Demetris Christofias pledged that Nicosia will continue supporting actively the further enhancement of this relationship, indicating a full membership candidate status for Armenia in the nearest future.
Cyprus, he said, is the firmest supporter and friend of Armenia in the EU.

See also

Armenia–European Union relations
Armenian education in Cyprus
Armenian genocide recognition
Armenian monuments in Cyprus
Armenian religion in Cyprus
Armenians in Cyprus
Cypriots in Armenia

References

External links
 Artsakank Armenian monthly and online publication  English language section
 Armenian National Committee of Cyprus website English language section
 AGBU Cyprus site

 
Cyprus
Bilateral relations of Cyprus